|}

The Prix de Cabourg is a Group 3 flat horse race in France open to two-year-old thoroughbreds. It is run at Deauville over a distance of 1,200 metres (about 6 furlongs), and it is scheduled to take place each year in late July or early August.

History
The event was created by the Société d'Encouragement in 1921. The organisation had taken over the duties of the Société des Courses de Deauville upon the death of its chairman Jacques Le Marois the previous year. The race was named after the nearby commune of Cabourg, and it was initially contested over 1,200 metres.

Deauville Racecourse was closed during World War II, and the Prix de Cabourg was not run from 1940 to 1945. It was cut to 900 metres in 1955, and its distance was frequently modified in the period thereafter. For brief spells it was contested over 1,000 metres (1956–57, 1961–64), 1,200 metres (1958–1960), 1,400 metres (1965–1970) and 1,300 metres (1971). Its present length, a return to 1,200 metres, was introduced in 1972.

For a period the Prix de Cabourg was classed at Listed level. It was promoted to Group 3 status in 1988.

Records
Leading jockey (6 wins):
 Cash Asmussen – Greinton (1983), Gallanta (1984), Qirmazi (1989), Coup de Genie (1993), With Fascination (1995), Crystal Castle (2000)

Leading trainer (9 wins):
 François Boutin – Madedoine (1971), Zapoteco (1972), Super Concorde (1977), River Lady (1981), Greinton (1983), Gallanta (1984), Hector Protector (1990), Kenbu (1991), Coup de Genie (1993)

Leading owner (5 wins):
 Sheikh Mohammed – Qirmazi (1989), Tereshkova (1994), Layman (2004), Alexandros (2007), Zanzibari (2009)

Winners since 1980

Earlier winners

 1921: Chloe
 1922: Ganimede
 1923: Cailis
 1924: Le Bijou
 1925: Take My Tip
 1926: Beauclerc
 1927: Ernagines
 1928: Cordial
 1929: Pearlash
 1930: Sereno
 1931: Le Becau
 1932: Pick Up
 1933: Sultano
 1934: Ping Pong
 1935: Pas Libre
 1936: Galloway
 1937: Arges
 1938: Nord Express
 1939: Floris
 1940–45: no race
 1946:
 1947: Turmoil
 1948: Dixmude
 1949: Magnetron
 1950: Galenite
 1951: Elu
 1952: Fort de France
 1953: Beigler Bey
 1954: Lightkeeper
 1955: Djanet
 1956: Turkrano
 1957: Precieuse Ridicule
 1958: Debut
 1959: Tope La
 1960: Jabbok
 1961:
 1962:
 1963:
 1964: Montagne
 1965: Si Sage
 1966:
 1967: Soyeux
 1968: Fast Ride
 1969: Avon
 1970: Sigisbee
 1971: Madedoine
 1972: Zapoteco
 1973: Dankaro
 1974: Tell Me Later
 1975: Sharazar
 1976: Adorant
 1977: Super Concorde
 1978: Lanngar
 1979: This Man

See also
 List of French flat horse races

References

 France Galop / Racing Post:

 france-galop.com – A Brief History: Prix de Cabourg.
 galop.courses-france.com – Prix de Cabourg – Palmarès depuis 1983.
 galopp-sieger.de – Prix de Cabourg.
 horseracingintfed.com – International Federation of Horseracing Authorities – Prix de Cabourg (2016).
 pedigreequery.com – Prix de Cabourg – Deauville.

Flat horse races for two-year-olds
Deauville-La Touques Racecourse
Horse races in France
Recurring sporting events established in 1921